Fuser is a rhythm game developed by Harmonix and published by NCSoft. It was released on November 10, 2020 for Microsoft Windows, Nintendo Switch, PlayStation 4, and Xbox One. Fuser allows players to create DJ mixes from a number of licensed musical tracks, awarding the player for synchronized changes of tracks. The game features both single-player and multiplayer modes as well as the means to share remixes with other users. Following the acquisition of Harmonix by Epic Games in 2021, Harmonix shuttered the multiplayer servers in December 2022 and removed the game and additional content from sale, while leaving the single player components playable.

Gameplay
In Fuser, the player takes the role of a DJ at a large concert and make a mashup of different songs. They have a virtual DJ table with four record players, custom instruments, sound filters, and up to 24 records (their crate) along the top of the screen. Each record has four tracks keyed by color and related to a type of musical instrument such as drums, guitar or vocals. At any time, the player can place a record, then select a specific track from that record, and then place it on any of the record players. This adds that instrument's track to the current mix across all four records, automatically adjusting the mix's tempo and musical key. New records/tracks can be added to any record player, overriding the previous track in the mix. Additionally, each player can be cued up with a second instrument track, which can be then switched back and forth individually, or all four players can be changed to the new ones by a single drop or using a "riser" that transitions them over a short period. Audio filters can be used on each instrument, and the user has the ability to create various instrument loops via a multibutton synthesizer which then can be added as another instrument to the current mix. This concept is comparable to Harmonix' prior game DropMix, which was a physical card game incorporating NFC technology with an electronic game board and mobile app that was published through Hasbro.

The game has a single-player campaign featuring multiple sets across various venues. At each set, the player attempts to make mixes, scoring more points by adding new tracks either on the downbeat or at specific beats by each instrument where the track drops. Additionally, the virtual audience will throw out requests, such as for specific songs, songs from a specific genre, or a certain type of instrument. Completing these requests in a short amount of time scores additional points. The player is ranked on a five-star scale based on their total score during the set. To achieve a high score, the player has the opportunity to customize the contents of the crate to be as efficient as possible in switching between tracks.

Fuser also includes both cooperative and competitive multiplayer modes that let players collaborate on creating a mix, or battle against each other. Players can also participate in weekly mix events that tasks players with creating a mix based around a particular musical genre or instrument that is then voted on by other players. The game also features a freestyle mode that allows players to create their own mixes and share them with others over social media.

Harmonix introduced the Headliner Spotlight feature in May 2021. This presents a few "Diamond Stage" dedicated Twitch channel which players can perform Fuser mixes in front of viewers. Players can earn in-game diamonds from other game activities to reserve spots on the Diamond Stage as well as to unlock additional cosmetics, songs, and other features. While a player is performing on the stage, viewers can submit requests, fashioned similar to those in the game's campaign mode, to challenge the current player.

Development
Harmonix had announced a publishing deal through NCSoft in August 2018 for a rhythm game for personal computers and consoles. Harmonix' Dan Sussman said that NCSoft had seen the game in an early state and quickly became their publishing partner for it, including support for showcasing the game at industry events. Fuser was announced at the 2020 PAX East event in February 2020, with plans for release on November 10, 2020.

Sussman said that Fuser was a continued evolution of their music games in how they have looked at player agency. With Fuser, Sussman believed that many players of their games have a wide range of musical tastes, as well wanting to have more control of how they interact with their music, thus enabling them to be creative with their tastes. Additionally, Harmonix found that with games like Rock Band, which offered a large number of songs, the songs essentially became disposable as players didn't have much incentive to learn the songs in details, and wanted a game that gave the player an opportunity to get more familiar with the structure of a song. Compared to many of Harmonix' past games, Fuser does not require any special peripherals. Harmonix's Dan Walsh said that accessibility and ease of bringing the game to market, both as retail and digital products, was a driver behind a peripheral-less game. Sussman also found that because Fuser featured new gameplay compared to any of their previous games, it was able to draw both experienced rhythm game players and new players into it.

Sussman said that as with past Harmonix games, songs from bands closely associated with Harmonix employees will likely also appear on the full setlist. Sussman also said that for music licensing purposes, they assured that the rights for these songs not only include the ability to mix with other songs, but for users to share these songs and mixes to social media.

Harmonix announced that the game's online features will shut down on December 19, 2022. The game and all DLC will be removed from sale, though players will still be able to use all content they own in the game's offline modes following this date. However, it was announced on December 16, 2022 that the servers would stay up until early 2023, due to an unspecified issue.

Soundtrack
The following songs are included with the base Fuser game:

Three songs were also available as pre-order bonuses. The pre-order bonuses were later released as normal DLC on January 21, 2021.

DLC

Upon release, 25 songs became available as the first batch of DLC.

On November 18, 2020, Harmonix announced the first batch of post-release DLC songs, along with the 2020 Backstage Pass which includes all songs and cosmetic packs released until the end of 2020. 

On February 10, 2022, it was announced that after the release of individual singles from the 2021 Mixtape pack in March, paid DLC releases for the game would cease, while music inside of the Diamond Shop will continue to be released.

Reception

Fuser received a generally positive reception from critics. The PC release received "mixed or average reviews".

References

External links
 

2020 video games
Music video games
Turntable video games
Windows games
Nintendo Switch games
PlayStation 4 games
Video games developed in the United States
Xbox One games
NCSoft games
Harmonix games
Multiplayer and single-player video games